Guy Cribb (born 1970) is a windsurfer and windsurfing trainer.

Career
Cribb is a former British racing coach and creator of the INtuition brand of technique coaching. He has been a technique and travel writer with regular features in the windsurfing press since 1990.

In 2010, he authored and produced the INtuition Gybing and Core Skills DVD. Cribb has also been involved as a R&D team member for leading industry brands between 1992 and 1999.

Gallery

Events
In October 2008 Guy and Antoine Albeau successfully completed a cross channel windsurf from Cherbourg, France to Sandbanks, Poole. A crossing of 75 nautical miles (138 kilometres) taking just over 6 hours.

Sponsors
JP Neil Pryde
holidayextras
Adidas
Animal
Pol Roger

Awards
13 x UK Champion Titles

5 x Vice World Champion

References

External links
Guy Cribb Intuition

English windsurfers
1960 births
Living people
Sportspeople from Poole
Sailing expeditions